Statistics of Austrian Football Bundesliga in the 1991–92 season.

Overview
Fall season is performed in 12 teams, and higher eight teams go into Meister playoff. Lower four teams fought in Mittlere Playoff with higher four teams of Austrian Football First League.

FK Austria Wien won the championship. An additional place for UEFA Cup was added following the UN ban to Yugoslavia.

Teams and location

Teams of 1991–92 Austrian Football Bundesliga
FC Admira/Wacker
Austria Salzburg
Austria Wien
Donawitzer
First Vienna
Kremser
Rapid Wien
Sankt Pölten
Stahl Linz
Swarovski Tirol
Sturm Graz
Vorwärts Steyr

Autumn season

Table

Results

Spring season

Championship playoff

Table

Results

Promotion/relegation playoff

Table

Results

References
Austria - List of final tables (RSSSF)

Austrian Football Bundesliga seasons
Aust
1991–92 in Austrian football